"Bâtard" (English: "Bastard") is a song by Stromae from his second album Racine carrée.

Chart positions

References

External links
  

2013 songs
Stromae songs
Songs written by Stromae